Jabril ibn Bukhtishu, (Jibril ibn Bakhtisha) also written as Bakhtyshu, was an 8th-9th century physician from the Bukhtishu family of Assyrian Nestorian physicians from the Persian Academy of Gundishapur. He was a Nestorian and spoke the Syriac language.

Grandson of Jirjis ibn Jibril, he lived in the second half of the eighth century.

He was physician to Ja'far the Barmakide, then in 805-6 to Harun al-Rashid and later to al-Ma'mun; died in 828-29; buried in the monastery of St. Sergios in al-Madain (Ctesiphon).

He wrote various medical works and exerted much influence upon the progress of science in Baghdad. Works attributed to him include Kitāb ṭabā’i‘ al-ḥayawān wa-khawāṣṣihā wa-manāfi‘ a‘ḍā’ihā ('Book of the Characteristics of Animals and Their Properties and the Usefulness of Their Organs'), written for Nasir al-Dawla; Risāla fī al-ṭibb wa-al-aḥdāth al-nafsāniyya ('Treatise on Medicine and Psychological Phenomena'); and Kitāb naʿt al-hayawān. He was a member of the Bakhtyashu family. He took pains to obtain Greek medical manuscripts and patronized the translators.

See also
List of Persian scientists
The Bukhtishu family.
Bukhtishu, Abdollah ibn.
 Yuhanna ibn Bukhtishu

Further reading 
 F. Wüstenfeld, Arabische Aerzte (15-16, 1840).
 Lucien Leclerc, Médecine arabe (vol. 1, 99-102, 1876).
 Max Meyerhof, New Light on Hunain ibn Ishaq (Isis, VIII, 717, 1926).

References

Further reading
 

Bushtishu, Jabril ibn
Physicians from the Abbasid Caliphate
9th-century Iranian physicians
Members of the Assyrian Church of the East
Iranian Assyrian people
Iranian Christians
Nestorians in the Abbasid Caliphate
9th-century people from the Abbasid Caliphate
Medieval Assyrian physicians